Shalimov is a Russian masculine surname, its feminine counterpart is Shalimova. It may refer to
Igor Shalimov (born 1969), Russian football manager and a former midfielder
Viktor Shalimov (born 1951), Russian ice hockey player
Vladimir Shalimov (1908–1942), Russian pilot
Russian-language surnames